
The following is a list of Playboy Playmates of 2016. Playboy magazine names their Playmate of the Month each month throughout the year.

In the March 2016 issue, playmates became "non nude", without any photographs of full frontal nudity.  This decision was reversed in 2017.

January

Amberleigh Deann West is a model, actress and the Playboy Playmate of the Month for January 2016 and her pictorial was shot by Sasha Eisenman.

February

Kristy Garett, born Kristy Goretskaya in Tbilisi, Georgian SSR, Soviet Union, is the Playboy Playmate of the Month for February 2016.  Her pictorial was shot by Sasha Eisenman. She was the last Playboy Playmate to appear nude in the magazine publication (until March 2017 when Playboy decided to bring nudity back to the magazines).

March

Dree Louise Hemingway is the Playboy Playmate of the Month for March 2016 and her pictorial was shot by Angelo Pennetta. She was the first Playboy Playmate not to appear nude in the magazine, after an editorial policy shift.

April

Camille Rowe is the Playboy Playmate of the Month for April 2016 and her pictorial was shot by Guy Aroch.

May

Brook Ashley Power is the Playboy Playmate of the Month for May 2016 and her pictorial was shot by Aaron Feaver. and the Playmate of the Year 2017.

June

Josiphene Marie Canseco is a model and the Playboy Playmate of the Month for June 2016 and her pictorial was shot by Henrik Purienne. She is a daughter of former Major League Baseball (MLB) outfielder and designated hitter Jose Canseco and former model Jessica Sekely. She auditioned for the Sports Illustrated Swimsuit Issue of 2016 prior to her pictorial with Playboy.

July

Alexandra Nicole Michael is the Playboy Playmate of the Month for July 2016 and her pictorial was shot by Jason Lee Parry.

August

Valerie van der Graaf is the Playboy Playmate of the Month for August 2016 and her pictorial was shot by David Bellemere. She also appeared in the Sports Illustrated Swimsuit Issue of 2014 prior to her pictorial with Playboy.

September

Kelly Olivia Gale is a fashion model and the Playboy Playmate of the Month for September 2016 and her pictorial was shot by Chris Heads.

October

Alexandra Katharine Silva (known professionally as Allie Silva) is a fashion model and the Playboy Playmate of the Month for October 2016 and her pictorial was shot by Henrik Purienne.

November

Ashley Bryanne Smith is a fashion model and the Playboy Playmate of the Month for November 2016 and her pictorial was shot by Zoey Grossman. She also appeared in the Sports Illustrated Swimsuit Issue of 2015 prior to her pictorial with Playboy.

December

Enikő Eva Mihalik is a Hungarian fashion model and the Playboy Playmate of the Month for December 2016 and her pictorial was shot by David Bellemere.

See also
 List of people in Playboy 2010–2019

References 

 2016
Playmates of 2016
2016-related lists